Fataluku (also known as Dagaga, Dagoda', Dagada) is a Papuan language spoken by approximately 37,000 people of Fataluku ethnicity in the eastern areas of East Timor, especially around Lospalos. It is a member of the Timor-Alor-Pantar language family, which includes languages spoken both in East Timor and nearby regions of Indonesia. Fataluku's closest relative is Oirata, spoken on Kisar island, in the Moluccas of Indonesia. Fataluku is given the status of a national language under the constitution. Speakers of Fataluku normally have a command of Tetum and/or Indonesian.

It has a considerable amount of Austronesian loanwords, and it has borrowed elements of Sanskrit and Arabic vocabulary via Malay.

Phonology

Vowels

Consonants 

¹ Spelled <tj> in Nácher orthography.

Words and phrases
In the examples below, the letter 'c' and the letter combination 'tx' are pronounced as the 'ch' in the English word 'church'.
Rau ana kapare? / e nicha rau rau / maice ana umpe? "how are you?"
Rau "good"
Kapare "not good"
Hó "yes"
Xaparau "thank you"
Tali even xaparau "thank you very much"
nitawane "you're welcome"
Favoruni "please"
itu nae tini "excuse me"
Ó lai'i "hello"
mua toto, ia toto,purupale " take care"
Kois ta niat ali fanuhene "see you later"

Pronoun						                Possessive pronoun 						
I   :		Aniri/Ana					My: Ahani			
You :		Eri (singular), Iri (plural)			Your:  Eheni(sing), Eheniere (plur) 
We  :		Iniri (excl), Afiri (inclusive) 		Our: Inihini (exc), Afihini: (incl) 
They : 		Tawari, Márafuri				Their: Their Tavarhini, Marafurhini
He/She :	Tavai, marí, mármocoi				His/Her: Tavahini, Marmokoihini
It :		Iví						Its: Ivihini, Tavahini

See also
 Rusenu language
 Languages of East Timor

Notes

Further reading

References

External links

 Fataluku Language Project
 Fataluku language website
 Fataluku community and language with Fataluku/English and English/Fataluku wordlists
 Fataluku wordlist at the Austronesian Basic Vocabulary Database
 Materials on Fataluku are included in the open access Arthur Capell collection. (AC2) held by Paradisec. 
 Songs in Fataluku are included in the Ros Dunlop collection held by Paradisec.
 The UCLA Library Modern Endangered Archives Program collection of Fataluku Language and Culture

Languages of East Timor
Oirata–Makasai languages